Peebles, Wisconsin (pronounced Pēbles) is an unincorporated community in the Town of Taycheedah in Fond du Lac County, Wisconsin. The community is located adjacent to the unincorporated community of Taycheedah. U.S. Route 151 runs through the community. Wisconsin Highway 149 used to run through the community at its western terminus until it was decommissioned in 2006. Taycheedah Correctional Institution is located in the town of Taycheedah several miles south of the community.

History
The community was named for Ezra Peebles, the original owner of the town site. In the past, the community was also known as Peebles Corners. In 1880, the area was home to a post office, tollgate, store, cheese-factory, and railroad depot for the Sheboygan and Fond du Lac Railroad.

Images

References

Unincorporated communities in Wisconsin
Unincorporated communities in Fond du Lac County, Wisconsin